Xuhua He (born 1979) is a Chinese mathematician.

Education and career
In 2001, He graduated with a bachelor's degree in mathematics from Peking University. In 2005 he received his PhD from Massachusetts Institute of Technology (MIT) with thesis Some subvarieties of the De Concini-Procesi compactification and advisor George Lusztig. As a postdoc research fellow, He was trained at the  He was at the Institute for Advanced Study for the academic year 2005–2006 and Simons Instructor at the State University of New York at Stony Brook from 2006 to 2008. At Hong Kong University of Science and Technology he was an assistant professor from 2008 to 2012 and an associate professor from 2012 to 2014. From 2014 to 2019 he was a professor at the University of Maryland. In 2019 he became a professor at the Chinese University of Hong Kong.

For the academic year 2016–2017, He was a von Neumann Fellow at the Institute for Advanced Study. In 2017 he was a Simons Visiting Professor at the Université Sorbonne Paris Nord (Paris 13 University).

In 1996, He won a gold medal at the International Mathematical Olympiad. In 2013 he received the Morningside Medal in gold. In 2018 in Rio de Janeiro he was an invited speaker with talk Some results on affine Deligne-Lusztig varieties at the International Congress of Mathematicians.

Selected publications

References

External links
 (with links to selected papers/preprints)

1979 births
Living people
20th-century Chinese mathematicians
21st-century Chinese mathematicians
Academic staff of the Hong Kong University of Science and Technology
Algebraic geometers
Chinese expatriates in Hong Kong
Chinese expatriates in the United States
Chinese University of Hong Kong people
Massachusetts Institute of Technology alumni
Peking University alumni
University System of Maryland faculty